Andrew Clifton Nicholson  (born 1 August 1961 in Te Awamutu) is a New Zealand horseman who has competed at six Olympic Games (though selected for seven). Born and raised in the Waikato Nicholson moved to England in the 1980s to further his equestrian career. He currently works there as a horse trainer.

Nicholson's greatest success at international level has been in Three-Day Event Teams. He won a gold medal at the 1990 World Equestrian Games in Stockholm, a silver at the 1992 Olympics in Barcelona and a Bronze at the 1996 Olympics in Atlanta. Although becoming infamous for his ride on Spinning Rhombus at Barcelona. With the New Zealand team having seven rails in hand to win the Gold medal his horse knocked down nine rails, instead of withdrawing as any lesser rider would have, in a colossal display of selflessness and national pride he kept the New Zealand team intact (his withdrawal would have instantly eliminated the entire team by dropping completing member numbers below the minimum required) to scoop the silver medal behind arch-rivals Australia. Nicholson competed at the 2010 WEG (world equestrian games) and received a bronze medal.

In the 2018 Queen's Birthday Honours, Nicholson was appointed an Officer of the New Zealand Order of Merit, for services to equestrian sport.

Nicholson and Mark Todd were the first New Zealanders to compete at six Olympic Games.

Nicholson's best individual results have been at Burghley which he has won five times on;
 Buckley Province in 1995,
 Mr Smiffy in 2000,
 Avebury in 2012, 2013 and 2014 consecutively.

After winning Burghley 2012 it set off a winning streak for Nicholson going on to win;
 Pau 2012 with his Olympic mount Nereo,
 Kentucky 2013 on four star debutant  Quimbo &
 Lumuhlen 2013 on Mr Cruise Control.

He also won Badminton Horse Trials with Nereo in 2017, after 36 completions.

CCI 5* Results

International Championship Results

References

External links

 
 

1961 births
Living people
New Zealand male equestrians
New Zealand event riders
Olympic silver medalists for New Zealand
Olympic bronze medalists for New Zealand
Olympic equestrians of New Zealand
Olympic medalists in equestrian
Equestrians at the 1984 Summer Olympics
Equestrians at the 1992 Summer Olympics
Equestrians at the 1996 Summer Olympics
Equestrians at the 2000 Summer Olympics
Equestrians at the 2004 Summer Olympics
Equestrians at the 2008 Summer Olympics
Equestrians at the 2012 Summer Olympics
Medalists at the 1992 Summer Olympics
Medalists at the 1996 Summer Olympics
Medalists at the 2012 Summer Olympics
People from Te Awamutu
Officers of the New Zealand Order of Merit
Sportspeople from Waikato